Maria Assumpta Convent School is a co-educational secondary school in Kashipur, Uttarakhand, India which was founded in 1987. It has an enrollment of 3,000 students. About  from the Kashipur city centre, it is located on Khokratal Road. Affiliated with the Central Board of Secondary Education, the school has football and cricket grounds, two basketball courts, and an on-campus church. It is administered by the Roman Catholic Diocese of Bareilly.

The medium of study is English. The School has given absolute results in Academic as well as co-curriculars. It has recently expanded to accommodate more classes.

House system
The school is divided into four houses. Each student is assigned a house at the start of his time in the school and will remain in that house for the whole of their school career.

The houses are:

References

External links

Catholic secondary schools in India
High schools and secondary schools in Uttarakhand
Christian schools in Uttarakhand
Education in Udham Singh Nagar district
Kashipur, Uttarakhand
1987 establishments in Uttar Pradesh
Educational institutions established in 1987